

NGC 2440 is a planetary nebula, one of many in our galaxy. Its central star, HD 62166, is possibly the hottest known white dwarf. The nebula is situated in the constellation Puppis.

It was discovered by William Herschel on March 4, 1790. He described it as "a beautiful planetary nebula of a considerable degree of brightness, not very well defined." The nebula is located about 1.23 kiloparsecs (3.79×1019 m) or about 4,000 light years from the Sun.

HD 62166

The central star HD 62166 has an exceptionally high surface temperature of about 200,000 kelvins and a luminosity 1,100 times that of the Sun. This dense star, with an estimated 0.6 solar mass and 0.028 solar radius, has an apparent magnitude of 17.5.

Notes

References

External links 

 Hubble Space Telescope reveals NGC 2440 on YouTube
 
 
 

Planetary nebulae
Puppis
2440
560-PN9